Fay Victor (born July 26, 1965) is an American musician, composer, lyricist and educator. Originally a singer in the traditional jazz field, she has been working in jazz, blues, opera, free improvising, avant-garde, modern classical music, and occasional acting since re-settling in New York in 2003.

Early life and career 
Victor was born in Brooklyn, New York City. After spending her early childhood years in New York, Zambia, and Trinidad & Tobago, her mother settled in Long island, NY, where Victor spent her teenage years. After her mother's sudden death, Victor re-discovered music and singing, and after a 3-month stint at a club in Fukui City, Japan with pianist Bertha Hope, she decided to start a career as a jazz singer. In 1996, Victor settled in Amsterdam, The Netherlands and performed and toured through the Netherlands, Spain, Germany, the UK, Sweden, Russia, and India. While living in the Netherlands, Victor branched out into blues, songwriting, and forms of improvising outside the standard jazz canon. Victor has lived in NYC since 2003. She has worked with the likes of Randy Weston, Roswell Rudd, Anthony Braxton, Misha Mengelberg, Vijay Iyer, Tyshawn Sorey, Wadada Leo Smith, Nicole Mitchell, Marc Ribot, Martine Syms, Daniel Carter, William Parker, Darius Jones, Wolter Wierbos, Ab Baars, Joe Morris, Sam Newsome, Reggie Nicholson.

Victor's work has been reviewed in The New York Times, Jazz Times, and Down Beat.

Music 
Victor has coined the term "freesong" to describe her vocal approach. In her jazz repertoire, Victor has specialized in the work of Thelonious Monk, Ornette Coleman and Herbie Nichols.

Activism 
Victor is co-director of the TalkRace forum and is a member of the "We Have Voice" collective.

Discography

As leader/co-leader

As featured artist/sideperson

References

External links 
 

21st-century American composers
American women composers
American women songwriters
Living people
1965 births
21st-century American women musicians
20th-century American composers
20th-century American women musicians
Musicians from Brooklyn
20th-century women composers
21st-century women composers
RareNoiseRecords artists